No Sin on the Alpine Pastures (German: Auf der Alm da gibt's koa Sünd) is a 1974 West German comedy film directed by Franz Josef Gottlieb and starring Alena Penz, Alexander Grill and Rinaldo Talamonti. It is part of the cycle of Bavarian sex comedies made during the era Location shooting took place in Austria.

Cast
 Alena Penz as Sally 
 Alexander Grill as Josef Sandler 
 Rinaldo Talamonti as Tino 
 Alexander Miller as Heiner 
 Eva Garden as Claudia 
 Sissy Löwinger as Anna Sandler 
 Gerd Eichen as Sepp Huber, Wirt 
 Erhard 'Bimbo' Weller as Emil 
 Jürgen Schilling as Lois 
 Walter Feuchtenberg as Prof. Solo 
 Joanna Jung as Zenzi 
 Elisabeth Felchner as Kuhhirtin 
 Hans Terofal as Xaver, Gendarm 
 Ulrich Beiger as Arzt 
 Otto Retzer as Pferdekutscher 
 Gerry Thiele as Apotheker 
 Heinz Gerstl as Bursche auf Volksfest 
 Walter Klinger as Franz
 Gudrun Velisek as Frau vom Sittlichkeitsverein

References

Bibliography
 Gabriele Eichmanns & Yvonne Franke. Heimat Goes Mobile: Hybrid Forms of Home in Literature and Film. Cambridge Scholars Publishing, 2013.

External links 
 

1978 films
1970s sex comedy films
West German films
1970s German-language films
Films directed by Franz Josef Gottlieb
Films scored by Gerhard Heinz
German sex comedy films
Constantin Film films
Films set in Bavaria
Films set in the Alps
1978 comedy films
1970s German films